Mestemacher is a German food company based in Gütersloh. It was founded in 1871.

Mestemacher produces a range of bread, cereal and cakes. The company exports products to more than 87 countries of the world including United States, France, Brazil and Croatia.

Speciality

A leading classic retail grocery trader in Germany, Mestemacher specializes in   pre-packaged Vollkornbrot - German-style dark wholegrain bread and other international varieties. These products are different from the conventional pre-packaged breads and baked items.

Brief history

The history of Mestemacher began in 1871 when master shoemaker Johann Heinrich Mestemacher started a modest bakery factory in Gütersloh for his 20-year-old son Wilhelm, a master baker. After 35 years in the bakery business, in 1910, Wilhelm introduced a specialist bakery for pumpernickel.

References

External links 
 

Food and drink companies of Germany
Food and drink companies established in 1871
1871 establishments in Germany